Synchiropus sechellensis, the Seychelles dragonet, is a species of marine ray-finned fish, a dragonet from the family Callionymidae. It is found in the Indo-Pacific from the Red Sea south to the Seychelles and the Maldives and east  as far as New Caledonia. Following a likely introduction via the Suez Canal, it was first recorded in the Mediterranean Sea in 2014; where it is found on rare occasions from Alexandria (Egypt) to the Gulf of Antalya (Turkey). 

This species was first formally described by Charles Tate Regan in 1908 with the type locality given as Seychelles.

References

sechellensis
Taxa named by Charles Tate Regan
Fish described in 1908